Agriotes obscurus is a species of click beetle native to Europe.

References

Elateridae
Beetles described in 1758
Beetles of Europe
Taxa named by Carl Linnaeus